Western Mass Pioneers is an American soccer team based in Ludlow, Massachusetts, United States. Founded in 1998, the team plays in USL League Two, the fourth tier of the American Soccer Pyramid.

The team plays its home games at Lusitano Stadium, where they have played since 1998. The team's colors are red, black and white.

History
In August 1997, the USISL announced it had awarded an expansion franchise to Gremio Lusitano, an amateur soccer club based in Ludlow, Massachusetts.  The USISL had set a condition for new teams which prohibited ethnic team names which prevented the club from using the name Gremio or Lusitano.  Therefore, the region's newspaper, the Springfield Union-News, held a week-long "name the team" contest which resulted in the selection of Pioneers. In October 1997, general manager Rick Andre named Leszek Wrona, who had both played for and coached Gremio Lusitano, as head coach of the Pioneers.  In September 1999, the Pioneers expressed an interest in moving up to the A-League after winning the USL D-3 Pro League.  However, the team elected to remain in the D-3 Pro League.  In 2001, John Voight replaced Wrona has head coach.  Wrona would return in 2005, leave in 2007 and return again in 2008.  By 2003, the team was fielding ten Junior Pioneer youth teams which competed in the Super Y-League.  Through all these years, the team has remained under the ownership of Gremio Lusitano.

On December 22, 2009, following the exodus of teams from the USL to the new North American Soccer League, the Pioneers announced that they would self-relegate, and play in the USL Premier Development League in 2010.

Players

Notable former players

This list of notable former players comprises players who went on to play professional soccer after playing for the team in the Premier Development League, or those who previously played professionally before joining the team.

  Anthony Augustine
  Almir Barbosa
  Steve Covino
  Mateus dos Anjos
  Paul Kelly
  Joe Germanese
  Jair
  Matt Jones
  Martin Klinger
  Yan Klukowski
  Neil Krause
  Bobby Shuttleworth
  Mike Lima
  David Mahoney
  Ryan Malone
  Brandon Tyler
  Adam Wallace
  Jay Willis

Year-by-year

Honors
 USL League Two Eastern Conference Champions 2021
 USL League Two Northeast Division Champions 2019, 2021
 USL Second Division Regular Season Champions 2005
 USL D-3 Pro League Northern Division Champions 2002
 USL D-3 Pro League Champions 1999
 USL D-3 Pro League Northern Division Champions 1999

Head coaches
  Leszek Wrona (1998–2001, 2004–2006, 2008–2010)
  John Voight (2002–2003)
  Tom d'Agostino (2007)
  Joe Calabrese (2011)
  Federico Molinari (2012–present)

Stadia
 Lusitano Stadium, Ludlow, Massachusetts (1998–present)

References

External links
 
 Western Mass Pioneers at USL League Two

 
Soccer clubs in Massachusetts
USL Second Division teams
Ludlow, Massachusetts
1998 establishments in Massachusetts
Diaspora soccer clubs in the United States
USL League Two teams
American Soccer League (2014–2017) teams